Kentucky Route 9 (KY 9) is a  state highway maintained by the Kentucky Transportation Cabinet in the U.S. Commonwealth of Kentucky. The highway extends from Grayson to Newport (a city in Kentucky across the Ohio River from Cincinnati, Ohio), roughly paralleling the Ohio River between Vanceburg and Newport.

Most of its path, from Grayson to the Interstate 275 loop in Wilder, is also known as the AA Highway (officially, the John Y. Brown Jr. AA Highway). KY 10 forms a branch of the AA Highway between Vanceburg and the Jesse Stuart Memorial Bridge in Grays Branch, near Greenup.

Route description

The AA Highway follows a general northwest–southeast orientation.  For most of its length, the AA Highway is a two lane road that passes through a sparsely populated rural area of Northern Kentucky.  While the highway passes through terrain that is rolling to hilly, the highway is generally level with moderate grades and no steep grades. Except for Carter County, all counties that the AA Highway passes through border the Ohio River.  The only municipalities on the highway are Vanceburg and Maysville and suburban areas of Cincinnati at its western terminus.  Those areas are also the only areas with any services used by motorists such as motels, gas stations, restaurants, convenience stores, etc.  The only traffic signals on the AA Highway are near Maysville (along a commercial strip with many retail establishments and restaurants), suburban Cincinnati, and at its eastern terminus just north of Interstate 64 near Grayson.  There are no rest areas on the AA Highway.  Other than the portions that traverse the edge of Maysville and enter suburban Cincinnati, there are no shopping centers or major retail stores along the AA Highway.

While the AA highway is not an expressway, it nonetheless serves as the shortest highway link between Cincinnati and Ashland, Kentucky.  As such, it provides a link between Cincinnati and other Midwestern cities such as Chicago, Indianapolis, and Dayton and cities south and east of Ashland such as Huntington and Charleston in West Virginia, Charlottesville and Richmond in Virginia, and Charlotte and Winston-Salem in North Carolina.

High accident rate
The AA Highway is a rural two-lane highway for most of its length and traverses through some desolate terrain. Driver inattention and speeding, in combination with the numerous side road entrances and at-grade intersections have made it a dangerous and deadly road. To address these issues, guide signs comparable to interstate-styled signs have been installed along the highway at major intersections, along with additional overhead lighting. Other measures to improve safety and increase capacity are under consideration.

History
The AA Highway was envisioned as a modern highway from Alexandria to Ashland.

Construction began in 1985 on the first segment of the AA Highway. Estimated to cost $266 million to complete, it was designed primarily as a two-lane controlled-access facility. The first phase also included the design of two twenty-five mile-long spurs running east from Vanceburg, one ending at US 23 near Lloyd and the Jesse Stuart Memorial Bridge, the other ending near Interstate 64 in Grayson.

When construction began, the costs for the first phase had risen to $292.7 million; the state had sold $300 million in bonds to pay for it. Segments of the highway, from Clarksburg just west of Vanceburg to Tollesboro was routed on an earlier relocated alignment of KY 10.

It officially opened in 1995; however, it was not formally dedicated until 2003.

Numbering quagmire
The AA Highway including the Greenup spur was originally designated as KY 546, and the Grayson spur was signed as KY 694. On May 26, 1988, the designation, "AA Highway," was proposed to be signed along with KY 546 and KY 694. A few years later, this designation was put in place with the AA Highway being co-signed with KY 546 and KY 694, however, many motorists were soon confused by the ever-changing designations.

To solve this issue, the AA Highway was renumbered in late 1995. The AA Highway including the Grayson spur was renumbered KY 9, and the Greenup spur was renumbered as KY 10. KY 10 also overlaps portions of the AA Highway throughout the entire highway's existence. Old KY 9 in Campbell county was renumbered as KY 915, and old KY 10 between Vanceburg and South Portsmouth was redesignated as KY 8.

Major intersections

Future
The Kentucky Transportation Cabinet is proposing widening and correcting some deficiencies and addressing growing traffic concerns along the AA Highway from its western terminus near Covington to Maysville. Several options are being considered, such as: removing some of the at-grade intersections, widening to four lanes from two with partial access control, and full access control.

The AA Highway widening study was undertaken. Many residents and users of the road were concerned about intersection safety, while others discussed the high volume of traffic and the lack of passing lanes. Four alternatives were considered:

 Alternate One: Do Nothing/No-Build
 This alternate involves no action to improve the roadway other than maintenance. It was not favored as it does not address any of the project goals. According to the Kentucky Transportation Cabinet: "Design Year 2025 traffic would operate at an LOS of E or F for the entire corridor. Sight distance, intersection safety, and speed differential problems would remain." Cost: None
 Alternate Two: Safety/Operational Improvements
 This alternate involves low cost improvements to the roadway. This alternative would only partially meet the project goals. It would increase the safety of the roadway but does not provide adequate capacity for design year traffic 2025. This alternate received considerable support. Cost: $100,000 to $30,000,000
 Rumble Strips: The KY 9 corridor has an "unusually large percentage of vehicle collisions with guardrails." Adding rumble strips would reduce these types of crashes by alerting the inattentive driver that they are leaving the roadway. "This also can potentially reduce the occurrence of drivers using the shoulders to pass vehicles because the audible and physical vibration would cause driver discomfort." The transportation cabinet is also "conducting a field evaluation of center-line rumble strips." During rainy conditions, the centerlines on the roadway would be further enhanced (visibility-wise) by the angle of the reflective painting on the strips.
 Field Entrances: Many of the field entrances, as indicated by the overgrowth of grass and shrubbery, that many are used infrequently. A lot of these entrances are located close to one another but cannot be combined due to the terrain. Entrances with poor sight distances should be considered for elimination. This may reduce crashes by eliminating merging and diverging traffic at these intersections.
 Driveway Entrances: These are very bad, as most have insufficient radii with guardrail placed too close to the edge of the pavement. Many entrances do not have right turn lanes, lighting, appropriate width, or a sufficient clear-zone.
 Truck Climbing Lanes: Some truck lanes begin too late into the steep grade of the hill to be really effective; others end too close to intersections. Delineators need to be added from the merge points to provide more time for the traffic to merge.
 Entrance Signs: Not all intersections are marked with a cross-road sign. Signage on the roadway should be assessed periodically to "confirm compliance with the MUTCD."
 Turn Flares: Many intersections have sufficient pavement to improve the turning radius onto side roads but "are not striped accordingly." These intersections should be restriped.
 T-Intersection Signage: Black-on-yellow double arrow warning signs at key intersections may be added to alert motorists of the side route's junction with KY 9.
 Fog: The entire KY 9 corridor is plagued by fog, usually more than 60 days a year. A public education campaign may help. Visibility sensors and weather stations along the highway may help increase notification in these fog events. Highway Advisory Radio messages may also prove to be a benefit. Another major alternative would be the "automated lane indication system," which is similar to airport technology. Lighting installed in the pavement outlining the lane edges is "activated automatically when heavy fog conditions are sensed. By having the lanes outlined, the lights greatly increase visibility conditions in times of heavy fog, thus creating safer operating conditions. Additionally, these lights are recessed into the pavement so as not to hinder snow removal operations. Since they are used at virtually every commercial airport in the United States, the lights are readily available and qualified installation services are easily attainable. This type of system has been used successfully in many locations, including Interstate 64 near Charlottesville, Virginia." Rest areas, to keep vehicles and trucks off the road during fog times, may provide a "safe haven".
 Lighting: A few intersections along the route are currently lacking overhead lighting. Many complaints, however, is the lack lighting overall on the corridor. Roadway lighting can reduce the ratio of night to day crashes. Intersections without lighting should be reconsidered for lighting, as they can reduce nighttime crashes by 45%.
 Driver Fatigue: Numerous crashes are attributed to driver fatigue. Many fatal crossover crashes can be attributed to the drivers falling asleep at the wheel. Public awareness, rumble strips, and rest areas are all solutions to this problem. Landscaping, improved lighting, roadside and pavement reflective markings, and billboards which could be targeted toward drowsy drivers have been discussed as well. Median barriers may also be installed, but they cost around $80,000 to $1,000,000 per mile depending on the need to widen the road to accommodate the barrier.
 Truck Traffic: A large volume of trucks utilize the AA Highway, some to avoid safety checks or heavier speed enforcement. Truck weigh stations may make the route safer for automobiles.
 Deer Collisions: Deer reflectors have been proven to work successfully where white tail deer are problematic to vehicular travel. These cost around $8,000 per mile and would not need to be installed in the entire project area and would require minimal maintenance needs.
 Intersection Delineation: Pavement marking on the side of KY 9 are rarely seen at intersections. The white stripe either "abruptly stops or curves with the radii of the intersecting road. This prevents drivers, especially in nighttime and fog conditions, from clearly seeing the driving lanes. Skip reflectors should be continued through the intersections to delineate the KY 9 roadway lane from the adjoining road. This will allow motorists to clearly see the driving lanes at all times through the intersection, and allows vehicles approaching the highway to determine the edge of KY 9."
 Alternate Three: Four Lane Facility with Limited Access
 This alternate considers the widening of the roadway throughout the study area with an additional travel lane in both directions. This can be done by using a concrete barrier wall or a depressed grass median. Access points would be spaced at a minimum of 1,200' apart. There would be a total of 4 12' lanes and 12' shoulders with both options. Several access points in each county would be closed or relocated to ensure minimum spacing.
Frontage roads may be used to link driveways that currently have KY 9 access. This would control the locations of incoming and outgoing traffic on the roadway. Relocation impacts would be minor.
 This alternate meets all project goals for design year 2025. It provides adequate capacity, improves roadway geometries, and eliminates sight-distance concerns. It would also reduce the number of crashes because of side road access improvements. It would also reduce the speed differentials created by "merging and diverging traffic in the truck lanes and intersections. Also, merging and diverging traffic at intersections would have a lane to turn into without fear of an impending rear-end collision."
 Cost: $12,887,000 (design), $3,589,000 (right of way acquisition), $540,000 (utilities), $161,082,000 (construction): $178,098,000 (TOTAL)
 Alternate 3 was highly favored.
 Alternate Four: Four Lane Facility with Fully Controlled Access
 This alternate is similar to alternate 3, but this alternate calls for a fully controlled access highway, similar to a freeway. In order to reduce the right of way needed, a  median with a concrete barrier should be considered. This will provide the "safety aspects of a median, without the added right of way width (and associated costs) required for a  depressed grass median."
Simple diamond interchanges, for the sake of the study and to estimate the expected cost, was used. No interchange decisions have been made in reality. This would require  of additional right of way compared to alternate 3. The number of relocations total approximately 95 residences and 1 business, and would require the closure or relocation of numerous entrances.
 Alternate 4 meets all project goals but at a much higher cost than alternate 3. The public perception of this alternate was not as favorable as it was to alternate 3 due to higher costs, the large number of relocations, and limited access. "The potential impacts to the area, including relocations, cultural-historic, archaeological and environmental sites, are much higher than Alternate 3."
 Cost: $33,860,000 (design), $19,410,000 (right of way acquisition), $2,140,000 (utilities), $423,252.000 (construction): $478,662,000 (TOTAL)

Two median types were considered: a concrete barrier wall and a depressed grass median. Mountable medians in rural areas are not recommended. With each median type option, there would be  travel lanes and  shoulders.

Also under consideration is using the existing alignment of the AA Highway as the eastward continuation of Interstate 74 from Cincinnati to Grayson, where it would connect with Interstate 64.  This would necessitate adoption of Alternate Four described above.

References

External links

KentuckyRoads.com KY 9

0009
0009